This article contains a list of freedom indices produced by several non-governmental organizations that publish and maintain assessments of the state of freedom in the world, according to their own various definitions of the term, and rank countries as being free, partly free, or using various measures of freedom, including civil liberties, political rights and economic rights.

Prominent indices
The indices and their origins:
Canada
 The Economic Freedom of the World Index is a report published by Canada-based Fraser Institute in conjunction with the Economic Freedom Network, a group of independent research and educational institutes in 90 nations and territories worldwide. It is a numeric index, and its results are not currently included in the table below.
Canada, United States, Germany
 The Human Freedom Index presents the state of human freedom in the world based on a broad measure that encompasses personal, civil, and economic freedom. The index presents a broad measure of human freedom, understood as the absence of coercive constraint. It uses 79 distinct indicators of personal and economic freedom. The index covers the following areas: Rule of Law, Security and Safety, Movement, Religion, Association, Assembly, Civil Society, Expression, Relationships, Size of Government, Legal System and Property Rights, Access to Sound Money, Freedom to Trade Internationally, and Regulation of Credit, Labor, and Business. The Human Freedom Index was created in 2015, covering 152 countries for years 2008–2012. The Human Freedom Index 2016 was published in November 2016, covering 159 countries for years 2008–2015. The report is co-published by the Cato Institute, the Fraser Institute, and the Liberales Institut at the Friedrich Naumann Foundation for Freedom. Co-authors of the report are Ian Vásquez and Tanja Porčnik.
 The Index of Freedom in the World was a predecessor to the Human Freedom Index. It measured classical civil liberties and was published in 2013 by Canada's Fraser Institute, Germany's Liberales Institute, and the U.S. Cato Institute. It is not currently included in the table below.
France
 Worldwide Press Freedom Index, is published each year since 2002 (except that 2011 was combined with 2012) by France-based Reporters Without Borders. Countries are assessed as having a good situation, a satisfactory situation, noticeable problems, a difficult situation, or a very serious situation.
Spain
 The World Index of Moral Freedom was first published on 2 April 2016, by the Foundation for the Advancement of Liberty, based in Madrid, Spain. This index ranks 160 countries by five categories of indicators: religious freedom, bioethical freedom, drugs freedom, sexuality freedom and family and gender freedom. The index aims at establishing the degree of individual freedom or state control on decisions pertaining to the great moral debates of our time.
Sweden
MaxRange, developed by Max Rånge, and maintained by Mikael Sandberg and Max Rånge, political scientists at Halmstad University, Sweden, is a data set defining a country's level of democracy and institutional structure (regime-type) on a 1000-point graded scale. Values are sorted based on level of democracy and political accountability. MaxRange defines the value corresponding to all states every month from 1789 to the present.
Varieties of Democracy (V-Dem) Institute, the V-Dem Institute, the Department of Political Science at the University of Gothenburg, Sweden, is an approach to conceptualizing and measuring democracy. It provides a multidimensional and disaggregated dataset that reflects the complexity of the concept of democracy as a system of rule that goes beyond the simple presence of elections. The V-Dem project distinguishes between five high-level principles of democracy: electoral, liberal, participatory, deliberative, and egalitarian, and collects data to measure these principles. With six principal investigators (PIs), seventeen project managers (PMs) with special responsibility for issue areas, more than thirty regional managers (RMs), 170 country coordinators (CCs), research assistants, and 3,000 country experts (CEs), the V-Dem project is one of the largest social science data collection projects focusing on research.
International IDEAs  "Global State of Democracy Report" provides democratic performance of 168 to 170 countries.. "The GSoD Indices are based on 116 individual indicators devised by various scholars and organizations using different types of sources: expert surveys, standards-based coding by research groups and analysts, observational data and composite measures. The Varieties of Democracy project is the largest contributor of indicators to the Global State of Democracies Indices.
Switzerland
Global Corruption Index, rates and ranks countries by a metric that measures the risk of corruption in the country by using 43 variables. It covers 196 countries and territories and is published by the Swiss-based company, Global Risk Profile.
UK
 The Democracy Index, published by the UK-based Economist Intelligence Unit, is an assessment of countries' democracy. Countries are rated as full democracies, flawed democracies, hybrid regimes, or authoritarian regimes. The index is based on 60 indicators grouped in five different categories measuring pluralism, civil liberties, and political culture.
US
 The CIRI Human Rights Data Project measures a range of human, civil, women's, and workers' rights. It was created in 1994 and is now hosted by the University of Connecticut. In its 2011 report, the U.S. was ranked 38th in overall human rights.
 Freedom in the World, published each year since 1972 by the U.S.-based Freedom House, ranks countries by political rights and civil liberties that are derived in large measure from the Universal Declaration of Human Rights. Countries are assessed as free, partly free, or unfree.
 Freedom of the Press is a report published each year since 1980 by Freedom House.
 The Index of Economic Freedom is an annual report published by The Wall Street Journal and the U.S.-based Heritage Foundation. Countries are assessed as free, mostly free, moderately free, mostly unfree, and repressed.
 The U.S.-based Polity data series is a widely used data series in political science research. It contains coded annual information on regime authority characteristics and transitions for all independent states with total populations greater than 500,000 and covers the years 1800–2018. Polity's conclusions about a state's level of democracy are based on an evaluation of that state's elections for competitiveness, openness, and level of participation. Data from this series is not currently included in the table below. The Polity work is sponsored by the Political Instability Task Force (PITF) which is funded by the U.S. Central Intelligence Agency; however, the views expressed in the reports are the authors' alone and do not represent the views of the U.S. Government.

Annual assessments
Here is a table of the assessments by four indices, for most countries of the world. For exact rankings rather than assessments, refer to the individual index articles.

List by country

Disputed territories

See also
 List of democracy indices
 Democracy-Dictatorship Index
 Areopagitica, writing by John Milton on the liberty of unlicensed printing to the Parliament of England
 Censorship by country
 Corruption Perceptions Index
 Ease of doing business index
 Freedom House
 Freedom in the World
 Indices of economic freedom
 Internet censorship and surveillance by country
 Media transparency
 Transparency (behavior)
 Transparency (market)
 United Nations Parliamentary Assembly

Notes and references

External links
 
 
 
 
 

Human rights-related lists
Index numbers
International rankings